The Windward Islands are the eastern group of the Society Islands in French Polynesia, an overseas collectivity of France in the southern Pacific Ocean. These islands were also previously named the Georgian Islands in honour of King George III of the United Kingdom.

Geography
The archipelago comprises an administrative division of French Polynesia, and includes the following islands:
Tahiti
Moorea
Mehetia
Tetiaroa
Maiao
The capital of the administrative district is Papeete on the island of Tahiti. Tahiti, Moorea, and Mehetia are high islands. Tetiaroa and Maiao are coral atolls.

Culture

The majority of the population speaks French and Tahitian (co-official with French throughout French Polynesia).

Administrative

The Windward Islands form the administrative subdivision of the Windward Islands (subdivision administrative des Îles du Vent), one of French Polynesia's five administrative subdivisions. The administrative subdivision of the Windward Islands geographically co-extensive with the electoral district of the Windward Islands (circonscription des Îles du Vent), one of French Polynesia's 6 electoral districts (circonscriptions électorales) for the Assembly of French Polynesia (see also Politics of French Polynesia).

See also

References

Islands of the Society Islands
Archipelagoes of the Pacific Ocean